Dublin City Libraries is the largest library authority in the Republic of Ireland, serving over half a million people through a network of 21 branch libraries, a number of specialist services.

Specialist services include online resources, Dublin City Archives, Dublin and Irish Local Studies Collection, Creative Studio, Music Library. With 2.6 million visits, and Wi-Fi Internet access available in all branches, the service aims to promote the concept of "lifelong learning in the community", offering a range of opportunities for all ages and backgrounds to "develop life chances and new learning skills".

The International Dublin Literary Award is administered by Dublin City Libraries.

The application for designation as a UNESCO City of Literature, part of the Creative Cities Network was initiated and led by Dublin City Libraries.

Services
Dublin City Libraries provides a range of services for readers, learners, students, hobbyists, the business community, and others. These include:
General collections and reference and information services
Online resources including eBooks, eAudiobooks, digital newspapers and magazines, online learning
Local Studies Collections and Archives in the Reading Room at the Dublin City Library and Archive
Broadband computers and Wireless (Wi-Fi) Internet access available in all branches
Business Information resources at the Central Library
The Creative Studio at Ballyfermot Library, a free to use digital maker space facilitating the creation of music recordings, podcasts, videos, digital stories and oral histories
Databases.dublincity.ie, a history and heritage resource, which includes online databases of Dublin City Electoral Lists, a Directory of Dublin Graveyards, Ancient Freemen of Dublin and community memory database which lists commemorative plaques around Dublin city.
Music Library at the Central Library. Access CDs, DVDs, vocal scores, miniature scores, sheet music, part-works, libretti, and songbooks. Other facilities available include CD listening booths, a keyboard and CD-track database.
An ongoing programme of events including lectures, readings, recitals and exhibitions
Language learning through online learning and conversation exchange in foreign languages
Services include multicultural services, home delivery service and services to prisons
Other services include the provision of meeting rooms to local community groups such as Historical Societies, Painting Groups, Parent & Toddler Groups, Writing groups, Reading groups and book clubs
Most branches provide quiet areas for study

Dublin City Library and Archive 

Dublin City Archives contains records of the civic government of Dublin from 1171 to the late 20th century. These records include Dublin City Council and committee minutes, account books, correspondence, reports, court records, charity petitions, title deeds, maps and plans and drawings all of which document the development of Dublin over eight centuries.

The Dublin and Irish Collection holds an extensive range of books relating to Dublin and Ireland to which are regularly added new publications. In addition to imprints dating from the 19th century, a considerable collection of older material is held of which the Gilbert Collection, with material from 16th to 18th centuries, forms the nucleus.

Other resources include the Dix Collection of mainly 17th and 18th century Dublin and Irish imprints, the Yeats Collection, the Children's Book Collection and imprints of publishers such as the Dun Emer and Cuala Press. The Dublin Collection holds material relevant to Dublin City including books, newspapers and journals, photographs, maps, prints, drawings, theatre programmes, playbills, posters, ballad sheets, political cartoons, audio-visual material and ephemera. A collection of Thom's Dublin street directories and other Dublin and Irish directories is also maintained.

Housed alongside the Dublin Collection, the Irish Collection extends to subjects of national interest and includes books and other materials relating to Ireland, by Irish authors, or in the Irish language. The collection includes available published sources for Irish genealogy and family history.

Dublin City Carnegie Libraries 

The philanthropist Andrew Carnegie (1835–1919) funded the building of four Carnegie Libraries in the Dublin City Libraries branch network, Dublin City Library and Archive, Pearse Street; Rathmines Library (terracotta by Gibbs and Canning of Tamworth, Staffordshire); Pembroke Library and Charleville Mall Library.  Dublin City Library and Archive, Pearse Street was originally opened in 1909. It was renovated and extended into two adjoining late-Georgian houses, reopening in 2003. Rathmines Library was built in 1913 and reopened following renovation in 2011. Pembroke Library, built in 1927 and opened in 1929, and was the last Carnegie Library opened in Ireland. The writer Frank O'Connor was appointed the first Librarian of Pembroke Library in December 1929.

One Dublin One Book
Since 2006, Dublin City Libraries have promoted a particular book with a series of public events.

References

External links
Dublin City Libraries website
Dublin City Libraries blog
Libraries Ireland Catalogue
Libraries and Archive - Heritage Databases

Public libraries
Libraries in Dublin (city)
Archives in the Republic of Ireland
Culture in Dublin (city)
Irish genealogy
Carnegie libraries in Ireland